Murray S. Kessler is an American businessman. He has worked in the food, tobacco and pharmaceutical industries. He is currently President and Chief Executive Officer of Perrigo Company plc, a global consumer OTC self-care company. Previously, he was President, Chairman of the Board and Chief Executive Officer of the Lorillard Tobacco Company before it was purchased by Reynolds American. Before that he was President, Chairman of the Board and Chief Executive Officer of UST, Inc. Kessler also currently serves as the volunteer President of the US Equestrian Federation, the national governing body for equestrian sports in the United States.

Biography

Early life
He received a Bachelor of Science in Business Administration from Villanova University and a Master of Business Administration in marketing and finance from the New York University Stern School of Business.

Career
He started his career at the Campbell Soup Company and Clorox. He served as Vice President of Sales and Marketing of Pace Foods, a division of Campbell Soup, from September 1995 to October 1997. He served as General Manager of the Swanson Division of Campbell Soup from October 1997 to March 1998. He served as Vice President of Pinnacle Foods from March 1998 to December 1999.

He served as President of the U.S. Smokeless Tobacco Company (UST) from April 2000 to October 2005, and as its President and Chief Operating Officer from November 2005 to December 2006. He served as its President and Chief Executive Officer from January 2007 to 2009. Additionally, from 2008 to 2009, he served as its chairman.

From 2009 to 2010, he served as vice chair of Altria.

In September 2010, he joined the Lorillard Tobacco Company as president and chief executive officer, as well as member of its board of directors, replacing Martin L. Orlowsky. Additionally, he has served as its chairman since January 1, 2011.

Kessler is currently the president and chief executive officer of Perrigo Company plc, a global consumer self-care company. He joined the company in October 8, 2018. The company is one of the leading manufacturers of over-the-counter (OTC) self-care products and solutions in North America, and offers branded product lines in Europe and other markets.

He married his wife Sarah in 2019.  His daughter, Reed Kessler, competed as a show jumper for the United States Equestrian team at the London 2012 Olympics.

Politics

In 2012, he donated money to Republicans like Mitt Romney for the presidency, Chris Shays for congressman, Howard Coble for senator, George Allen for senator, Mitch McConnell for senator, as well as Democrats like Kay Hagan for Senator, and Susan Bysiewicz for Secretary of State of Connecticut.

References

Living people
Villanova University alumni
New York University Stern School of Business alumni
American chief executives
Altria Group
Lorillard Tobacco Company
Year of birth missing (living people)